The 2015 America East Conference softball tournament will be held at University Field on the campus of Stony Brook University in Stony Brook, New York from May 7 through May 9, 2015. The tournament will earn the America East Conference's automatic bid to the 2015 NCAA Division I softball tournament. The tournament will only have the championship series broadcast. The championship will be available on AmericaEast.tv with Andrew Bogush and Scott Greene providing the call.

Tournament

All times listed are Eastern Daylight Time.

References

Tournament
America East Conference softball tournament